"Sleepin' with the Radio On" is a song written by Stephen Allen Davis, and recorded by American country music artist Charly McClain.  It was released in August 1981 as the second single from the album Surround Me with Love.  The song reached #4 on the Billboard Hot Country Singles & Tracks chart.

Chart performance

Culture
In the television series Hart to Hart, Charly McClain performs the song as singer Lorene Tyler in season 3's episode 7, titled "Rhinestone Harts". The episode first aired on December 1, 1981.

References

1981 singles
1981 songs
Charly McClain songs
Epic Records singles
Songs about radio
Songs about sleep
Songs written by Stephen Allen Davis